Gustav Giemsa (November 20, 1867 – June 10, 1948) was a German chemist and bacteriologist who was a native of Medar-Blechhammer (now part of the city Kędzierzyn-Koźle). He is remembered  for creating a dye solution commonly known as "Giemsa stain". This dye is used for the histopathological diagnosis of malaria and parasites such as Plasmodium, Trypanosoma, and Chlamydia.

Giemsa studied pharmacy and mineralogy at the University of Leipzig, and chemistry and bacteriology at the University of Berlin. Between 1895 and 1898 he worked as a pharmacist in German East Africa. He was an early assistant to Bernhard Nocht at the Institut für Tropenmedizin in Hamburg, where in 1900 he became head of the Department of Chemistry. 

In 1904 Giemsa published an essay on the staining procedure for flagellates, blood cells, and bacteria. Giemsa improved the Romanowsky stain (Eosin Y and Methylene Blue) by stabilizing this dye solution with glycerol. This allowed for reproducible staining of cells for microscopy purposes. This method is still used in laboratories today. 

In 1933 Giemsa signed the Vow of allegiance of the Professors of the German Universities and High-Schools to Adolf Hitler and the National Socialistic State. He also joined the NSDAP.

References
 Ernst Klee: Das Personenlexikon zum Dritten Reich. Wer war was vor und nach 1945. Fischer Taschenbuch Verlag, Zweite aktualisierte Auflage, Frankfurt am Main 2005, S. 182.
 Fleischer B. Editorial: 100 years ago: Giemsa's solution for staining of plasmodia. Trop Med Int Health. 2004 Jul;9(7):755-6.

External links
 

1867 births
1948 deaths
19th-century German chemists
German microbiologists
Nazi Party members
People from the Province of Silesia
Leipzig University alumni
Humboldt University of Berlin alumni
20th-century German chemists